Kilnhurst West railway station was the second railway station on the Midland line in Kilnhurst, South Yorkshire, England. It was one of two railway stations serving the village, the other being Kilnhurst Central. They were situated at either end of the village's main thoroughfare, Victoria Street. The first station in the village, believed to have been on the south side of the bridge, opened by the North Midland Railway, was closed in January 1851.

This station was located on the former North Midland Railway and was served mainly by Sheffield Midland - Cudworth - Leeds stopping services. The station booking office was at road level, with an entrance on Highthorn Road, and was linked to its four platforms by a covered wooden footbridge. By the early 1980s little remained of the station.

The station was closed, along with others on the line, when these trains were axed on 1 January 1968.

Station House, the ex station manager's house still stands on the south west side of the overbridge at the junction of Highthorn Road/Wentworth Road.

References

External links 
 Kilnhurst stations on navigable 1955 O. S. map

Disused railway stations in Rotherham
Railway stations in Great Britain closed in 1968
Railway stations in Great Britain opened in 1841
Former Midland Railway stations